Aluminium bromide  is any chemical compound with the empirical formula AlBrx.  Aluminium tribromide is the most common form of aluminium bromide. It is a colorless, sublimable hygroscopic solid; hence old samples tend to be hydrated, mostly as aluminium tribromide hexahydrate (AlBr3·6H2O).

Structure
The dimeric form of aluminium tribromide (Al2Br6) predominates in the solid state, in solutions in noncoordinating solvents (e.g. CS2), in the melt, and in the gas phase.  Only at high temperatures do these dimers break up into monomers:
 Al2Br6  → 2 AlBr3 ΔH°diss  = 59 kJ/mol

The species aluminium monobromide forms from the reaction of HBr with Al metal at high temperature.  It disproportionates near room temperature:
6/n "[AlBr]n"  → Al2Br6  +  4 Al
This reaction is reversed at temperatures higher than 1000 °C. Aluminium monobromide has been crystallographically characterized in the form the tetrameric adduct Al4Br4(NEt3)4 (Et = C2H5).  This species is electronically related to cyclobutane.  Theory suggest that the diatomic aluminium monobromide condenses to a dimer and then a tetrahedral cluster Al4Br4, akin to the analogous boron compound.

Al2Br6 consists of two AlBr4 tetrahedra that share a common edge.  The molecular symmetry is D2h.

The monomer AlBr3, observed only in the vapor, can be described as trigonal planar, D3h point group.  The atomic hybridization of aluminium is often described as sp2.  The Br-Al-Br bond angles are 120 °.

Synthesis

By far the most common form of aluminium bromide is Al2Br6.  This species exists as hygroscopic colorless solid at standard conditions.  Typical impure samples are yellowish or even red-brown due to the presence of iron-containing impurities.  It is prepared by the reaction of HBr with Al:
2 Al  +  6 HBr  →   Al2Br6  +  3 H2
Alternatively, the direct bromination occurs also:
2 Al  +  3 Br2  →   Al2Br6

Reactions

Al2Br6 dissociates readily to give the strong Lewis acid, AlBr3.  Regarding the tendency of Al2Br6 to dimerize, it is common for heavier main group halides to exist as aggregates larger than implied by their empirical formulae.  Lighter main group halides such as boron tribromide do not show this tendency, in part due to the smaller size of the central atom.

Consistent with its Lewis acidic character, Al2Br6 is hydrolyzed by water with evolution of HBr and formation of Al-OH-Br species.  Similarly, it also reacts quickly with alcohols and carboxylic acids, although less vigorously than with water.  With simple Lewis bases (L), Al2Br6 forms adducts, such as AlBr3L.

Aluminium tribromide reacts with carbon tetrachloride at 100 °C to form carbon tetrabromide:
 4 AlBr3 + 3 CCl4  → 4 AlCl3 + 3 CBr4

and with phosgene yields carbonyl bromide and aluminium chlorobromide:
 AlBr3 + COCl2  → COBr2 + AlCl2Br

Al2Br6 is used as a catalyst for the Friedel-Crafts alkylation reaction.   Related Lewis acid-promoted reactions include as epoxide ring openings and decomplexation of dienes from iron carbonyls.  It is a stronger Lewis acid than the more common Al2Cl6.

Safety
Aluminium tribromide is a highly reactive material.

References

Bromides
Aluminium compounds
Metal halides
Acid catalysts